|}

The Prix de Lutèce is a Group 3 flat horse race in France open to three-year-old thoroughbreds. It is run at Longchamp over a distance of 3,000 metres (about 1⅞ miles), and it is scheduled to take place each year in early September.

History
The event is named after Lutetia (in French, Lutèce), a Gallo-Roman city located on the site of what is now Paris. The first version was established in 1864, and it usually took place in the spring. Its conditions varied, but in its later years it was a 2,400-metre race for horses aged three or older. It continued to be staged until 1968.

The present version, a long-distance event for three-year-olds, was first held in 1978. It now serves as a trial for the following month's Prix Royal-Oak. The last horse to win both races in the same year was Agent Double in 1984.

The modern Prix de Lutèce is currently run in September, but it was part of early October's Prix de l'Arc de Triomphe fixture from 1988 to 1998.

Records
Leading jockey since 1978 (7 wins):
 Christophe Soumillon – Etendard Indien (2004), Shamdala (2005), Getaway (2006), Shemima (2008), Vazirabad (2015), Darbuzan (2017), Paix (2020)

Leading trainer since 1978 (9 wins):
 André Fabre – Galant Vert (1983), Balsam (1987), Mardonius (1989), Epitre (2000), Street Shaana (2001), Etendard Indien (2004), Getaway (2006), Coastal Path (2007), Brigantin (2010)

Leading owner since 1978 (7 wins):
 HH Aga Khan IV – Anazid (1986), Shaiybara (1993), Valirann (2013), Shamdala (2005), Shemima (2008), Verema (2012), Vazirabad (2015)

Winners since 1978

Earlier winners

 1865: Tourmalet
 1866: Etoile Filante
 1867: Normandie
 1868: Le Petit Caporal
 1869: L'Oise
 1870: Sornette
 1872: Faublas
 1873: Franc Tireur
 1874: Franc Tireur
 1875: Dictature
 1876: Chassenon
 1877: Caen
 1878: Balagny
 1880: Castillon
 1881: Le Destrier
 1882: Veston
 1884: Sansonnet
 1886: Aida
 1887: Richelieu
 1888: Avril
 1892: Amadis
 1893: Boudoir
 1895: Jaffa
 1896: Merlin
 1898: Elf
 1899: General Albert
 1900: Melina
 1901: Pomona
 1903: Alençon
 1905: Rataplan
 1906: Hilarion
 1907: Montlieu
 1908: Biniou
 1909: Moulins la Marche
 1910: La Francaise
 1911: Sablonnet
 1912: Lahire
 1913: Carandor
 1914: Shannon
 1920: Neomenie
 1921: Sereska
 1922: Flechois
 1923: Flechois
 1924: Filibert de Savoie
 1925: Ariel
 1926: Hohneck
 1927: Chicaneau
 1928: Cistercien
 1929: Le Parquet
 1930: Picaflor
 1931: Amfortas
 1932: Bara
 1933: Nanaia
 1934: Trop Presse
 1935: Fedor
 1936: Cardon
 1937: Horncastle
 1938: Frisquet
 1939: Tali
 1940: Ribera
 1941: Pas un Sou
 1942: Quicko
 1951: Coast Guard
 1954: Vamos
 1956: Elpenor
 1959: Etwild
 1962: Snob
 1967: Bon Mot
 1968: Carnaval

See also
 List of French flat horse races

References
 France Galop / Racing Post:
 france-galop.com – A Brief History: Prix de Lutèce.
 galopp-sieger.de – Prix de Lutèce.
 horseracingintfed.com – International Federation of Horseracing Authorities – Prix de Lutèce (2016).
 pedigreequery.com – Prix de Lutèce – Longchamp.

Flat horse races for three-year-olds
Longchamp Racecourse
Horse races in France
Recurring sporting events established in 1864
1864 establishments in France